Professor Julie Hazel Campbell AO FAA (born 2 November 1946) is an Australian vascular biologist from Sydney, Australia. Campbell is a professorial fellow at the Australian Academy of Science and is a world leader in the field of smooth muscle biology and, along with her husband, holds two patents for vascular implant material.

Early history
Campbell was born on 2 November 1946, in Sydney, Australia. Campbell's mother was one of nine children and worked as a physical education teacher. At the age of twelve, Campbell's father began to work to support her mother and siblings after the passing of her father.  During Campbell's adolescent ages, she was fiercely competitive. In the fourth grade, she was selected to attend an advanced class that was specifically reserved for high achievers. She also attended a competitive high school, known as the St. George Girls High School. After high school, Campbell felt burnt out and decided to work at the Atomic Energy Commission during the day, and study chemistry part-time at the University of New South Wales in the evenings. She had always intended to pursue a career in chemistry, and did not take any biology classes until university. After taking her first biology course, Campbell became fascinated with the structure and activities of living cells, and went to study physiology instead of chemistry. She was the first physiology honors student at her university.

Family history 
Campbell married her husband when she was at the age of 22. In 1975, both Campbell and her husband had the career position of postdoctoral research in the Department of Zoology at the University of Melbourne. In 1976, both Campbell and her husband followed their first Ph.D. supervisor, Burnstock, to the University College of London for a year to continue their postdoctoral research in the Department of Anatomy and Embryology. Then, in 1978, the couple went to the University of Iowa for nine months, before going to the University of Washington in Seattle to finish their postdoctoral research. During this period of time, Campbell had three children, but continued to dedicate much of her time to her research and work. She had worked at the Baker Medical Research Institution for 13 years. Her husband had also worked at the Baker Medical Research Institution for 2 years, after being offered a senior position at the University of Melbourne. In 1991, Campbell's husband was offered the chair of anatomy at the University of Queensland, so the couple had moved once more. Today, all three of her children are currently university students, and together with her husband, they own two cattle properties.

Career
In 1968, Campbell attended the University of New South Wales, where she graduated as an honor student with a bachelor's degree in science in physiology. In 1973, she received her doctorate degree in neurology from the University of Melbourne. Campbell is a cell biologist specializing in vascular smooth muscle. 

Campbell's postdoctoral experience extends from working at the University of Melbourne (1973–75), University College London (1976), the University of Iowa (1977) and the University of Washington (1977–78). During this period, she researched the biology of smooth muscle cells in normal artery walls of the human body. She recognized the importance of her findings for treating arteries affected by Atherosclerosis.

In 1978, when Campbell returned to Australia, she was employed by the Baker Medical Research Institute in Melbourne. From this period, she obtained the career position as a senior research officer at the institution (1978–80). Her studies consolidated her early findings on vascular smooth muscle biology.

In 1991, she left her position as the principal research fellow (1987–91) at the Baker Medical Research Institute. Campbell moved to Brisbane and became the founding director of the Centre for Research in Vascular Biology at the University of Queensland. With her experience, she obtained the career position as the principal research fellow in the Department of Anatomical Sciences (1991–94). She became the inaugural president of the Australian Vascular Biology Society in Institute at the Wesley Hospital in 1996.

Current projects
Today, Campbell continues her work that ultimately began back in the early 1980s. Both Campbell and her husband began their work by looking at the origin of Myofibroblasts, which form as part of the inflammatory response to a wound. They noticed that these Myofibroblasts resembled the cells that form arteries, and hoped to eventually use this knowledge to grow artificial arteries and vessels. Campbell has been developing a technique to grown the artificial blood vessel in the body cavity of the person it will be implanted in, to reduce the risk of rejection. In 1992, Campbell founded the Australian Vascular Biology Society, which she cites as the achievement she is most proud of. Additionally, she is the current chair of the Queensland Fellows of the Australian Academy of Science, and a member of the council.

Recognition for achievements 
Campbell has won worldwide acclaim for her ground-breaking research into the development of blood vessels naturally within a patient. This process is undergoing pre-clinical trials in humans and may be used to treat patients suffering coronary heart disease, renal failure and other life-threatening conditions. This ‘Grow Your Own Arteries’ technique is helping patients survive coronary heart disease, renal failure and other life-threatening conditions.

Campbell was awarded the Wellcome Australia Medal for Medical and Scientific Research. During this year, she has obtained the position as Senior Principal Research Fellow at the National Health and Medical Research Council (NHMRC), and she was also a research professor at the University of Queensland.

In the 2006 Queen's Birthday Honours Campbell was appointed Officer of the Order of Australia (AO) for "service to science and to medical research, particularly in the area of cell biology of coronary artery and other vascular diseases, and to education".

Present positions 
Campbell is currently:
 Senior principal research fellow, NHMRC
 Research professor, University of Queensland
 Director, Centre for research in Vascular Biology at the School of Biomedical Sciences at the University of Queensland 
 Director, Wesley Research Institute, Wesley Hospital.
 Director, VasCam Pty Ltd.
 Member of executive committee (EXCOM) and council, Australian Academy of Science.
 Secretary of education and public awareness, Australian Academy of Science.
Her main career is the director of the Australian Institute for Bioengineering and Nanotechnology (AIBN) for the University of Queensland.

Awards 
Campbell has been awarded:

 The Wellcome Australia Medal and Award for 1995
 Fellow of Australia Academy of Sciences 2000
 Centenary Medal 2003
 Queensland Greats Award 2004
 Officer of the Order of Australia (AO) in the General Division 2006
 Queensland Businesswoman of the Year 2007 — Public & Not for Profit Section

Publications 
 228 international scientific journals 
 2 international patents 
 65 lectures at the international conferences 
 4 books on cardiac muscle, vascular smooth muscle and tissue engineering of the arteries
 "Therapeutic Uses of Beta-casein a2 and dietary supplement containing beta-casein a2"
 Grow Your Own Arteries

References

Australian women biologists
1946 births
Living people
University of New South Wales alumni
University of Melbourne alumni
University of Melbourne women
Queensland Greats
Academic staff of the University of Queensland
Fellows of the Australian Academy of Science
Officers of the Order of Australia